Xavier Beauvois (born 20 March 1967) is a French actor, film director and screenwriter.

Career
His film Don't Forget You're Going to Die was entered into the 1995 Cannes Film Festival where it won the Jury Prize.

His film Of Gods and Men received the Grand Prix and the Prize of the Ecumenical Jury at the 2010 Cannes Film Festival. The film was also selected as France's submission for the Academy Award for Best Foreign Language Film at the 83rd Academy Awards, but it did not make the final shortlist.

His 2014 film La Rançon de la gloire was selected to compete for the Golden Lion at the 71st Venice International Film Festival.

Personal life
He is married to film editor Marie-Julie Maille. They have two sons, Arthur, who was born in August 1992, and Antoine, born May 1996.

Filmography

References

External links

1967 births
Living people
People from Auchel
20th-century French male actors
21st-century French male actors
French male film actors
French film directors
French male screenwriters
French screenwriters